George Robert Beckmeyer (May 7, 1920–June 7, 1977) was an American politician and businessman.

Beckmeyer was born in Posey, Illinois. He went to the Nashville, Illinois public schools and Culver Military Academy. Beckmeyer served in the United States Army Air Forces during World War II. Beckmeyer went to University of Illinois and Wabash College. He was involved with the retail department store and real estate businesses in Nashville, Illinois. Beckmeyer served in the Illinois House of Representatives in 1955 and 1956 and was a Republican. In 1966, Beckmeyer ran for the United States House of Representatives and lost the election. He also served as mayor of Nashville, Illinois from 1970 to 1974. Beckmeyer died at the veterans hospital at the Jefferson Barracks Military Post in St. Louis, Missouri. He had been ill for one month.

Notes

External links

1920 births
1977 deaths
People from Clinton County, Illinois
People from Nashville, Illinois
Businesspeople from Illinois
Military personnel from Illinois
University of Illinois Urbana-Champaign alumni
Wabash College alumni
Mayors of places in Illinois
Republican Party members of the Illinois House of Representatives
20th-century American politicians
20th-century American businesspeople